Paul Street may refer to:
 Paul Street (director), British film director
 The Paul Street Boys, a 1906 novel by Ferenc Molnár
 The Boys of Paul Street, 1969 film of the above book

See also
 St. Paul Street (disambiguation), various roads of that name

Human name disambiguation pages